Bajrići is a village in the municipality of Cazin, Bosnia and Herzegovina. It is located just east of Bajrići, in Bihać municipality.

Demographics 
According to the 2013 census, its population was 391.

References

Populated places in Cazin